The Secret Lives of Colour is a 2016 non-fiction book by British writer Kassia St. Clair which explores the cultural and social history of colours. The book, which is based on a column St. Clair writes for British magazine Elle Decoration, is organized in a series of chapters by color, arranged from white to black. Each chapter is composed of short, two to four page, essays on different shades of its respective color, discussing an interesting aspect of science, history, art, or culture relating to the shade. There are a total of 75 essays in the book. Each page is bordered by a stripe of the color it discusses for easy visual identification, even when the book is closed.

Reception

The book was generally well-received by critics. NPR listed it on its Best Books of 2017 list. Lily Le Brun of The Economist found the book's design visually appealing and helpful for referencing. Cathy Dillon of The Irish Times called it "perfect gift for a colour enthusiast". Laura J. Snyder of The Wall Street Journal wrote that it brought the history of both science and art "into vivid relief." 

Critics responded particularly well to the breadth of subjects discussed. Claire Voon of Hyperallergic found it "diligently researched," and remarked on the topical diversity of the various essays. Ross Stewart of Chemistry World described the vignette structure as an "effective...conceit" allowing St. Clair to "dance effortlessly through an astonishing range of subjects." Lucy Watson's review in the Financial Times was more critical, describing the book as "somewhat fragmented," and expressing disappointment that the book focused on anecdotes without discussing the classification of color as a broad topic.

References 

2016 non-fiction books
Art history books
Books about color
Design books
John Murray (publishing house) books
Penguin Random House
Color in culture